Hard to Get is a 1929 American pre-Code comedy film directed by William Beaudine and starring Dorothy Mackaill, Charles Delaney and James Finlayson.

Plot
A dress shop employee falls in love with a millionaire.

Cast
 Dorothy Mackaill as Bobby Martin 
 Charles Delaney as Jerry Dillon 
 James Finlayson as Pa Martin 
 Louise Fazenda as Ma Martin 
 Jack Oakie as Marty Martin 
 Edmund Burns as Dexter Courtland 
 Clarissa Selwynne as Mrs. Cortland

See also
 Classified (1925)

References

External links

Still #1 and #2 at gettyimages.com

1929 films
Silent American comedy films
American black-and-white films
1929 comedy films
1920s English-language films
Films directed by William Beaudine
Warner Bros. films
Films based on American novels
Remakes of American films
Sound film remakes of silent films
Films based on works by Edna Ferber
1920s American films